The 2021–22 season was the 32nd season in the existence of İstanbul Başakşehir and the club's eighth consecutive season in the top flight of Turkish football. In addition to the domestic league, İstanbul Başakşehir participated in this season's edition of the Turkish Cup.

Kits 
İstanbul Başakşehir's 2021–22 home and away kits, manufactured by Bilcee, released on 11 August 2021 and were up for sale on the same day. The third jersey was introduced separately on 3 September 2021, in a special screening.

Supplier: Bilcee
Main sponsor: Decovita

Back sponsor: Aksa
Sleeve sponsor: Jakamen, HDI Sigorta

Short sponsor: YKT Filo Kiralama
Socks sponsor: HDI Sigorta

Players

First-team squad

Out on loan

Transfers

Pre-season and friendlies

Competitions

Overall record

Süper Lig

League table

Results summary

Results by matchday

Matches

Turkish Cup

Statistics

Goalscorers

References

İstanbul Başakşehir F.K. seasons
İstanbul Başakşehir